Robin Elizabeth Miller (born 8 September 1940 – 7 December 1975), known as "The Sugarbird Lady", was an Australian aviatrix and nurse. The name "The Sugarbird Lady" was given to her by outback Aboriginal children during her work combatting polio. She died of cancer at the age of 35.

Biography
Her mother was the writer Dame Mary Durack, and her father was an aviator, Captain Horrie Miller.

After obtaining a private pilot licence and a commercial flying licence while training as a nurse, she approached the Western Australian Department of Health to ask permission to fly to northern Western Australia in order to carry out a vaccination programme. Permission granted, she borrowed money for a Cessna 182 Skylane and set out on her first flight on 22 May 1967. Travelling to remote communities, she would treat children with the Sabin vaccine in sugar lumps. She later flew with the Royal Flying Doctor Service of Australia (RFDS).

In 1973 she married Harold Dicks, the director of the Royal Flying Doctor Service, and became Robin Miller Dicks. Later that year she was sponsored along with Rosemary de Pierres to compete in the 1973 All Women's Transcontinental Air Race across the United States, a.k.a. the Powder Puff Derby, finishing sixth past the finishing post.

After cancer took her life in 1975, her husband set up a A$50,000 memorial foundation to help nurses get flying licences.

She is remembered fondly in Perth, Western Australia; as well as the large memorial in Jandakot Airport, there is also a seminar room in the Royal Perth Hospital named after her, in addition to a road at Perth Airport: Sugarbird Lady Road.

Quotes

Two quotes from ABC's "George Negus Tonight" described her flying prowess:

Nancy Bird (a friend):

Michael Page (publisher):

Awards
 Diploma of Merit — Associazione Nazionale Infermieri, Italy (1969)
 Nancy Bird (Walton) Award — Australia's woman pilot of the year (1970)
 Paul Tissandier Diploma — Federation Aeronautique Internationale (posthumous)
 Brabazon Cup — Women Pilots' Association of Great Britain (posthumous)

Further reading

 
 
 Sun News-Pictorial (Melbourne), 8 Dec 1975
 The West Australian, 8 Dec 1975

References

External links
 'Dicks, Robin Elizabeth (1940–1975)', Australian Dictionary of Biography
 Guide to the Papers of Robin Miller Dicks MS Acc08.114. National Library of Australia

1940 births
1975 deaths
People from Perth, Western Australia
Australian aviators
Australian nurses
Australian women nurses
Australian women aviators